Robert Roxby (16 March 1926 – 7 February 2010) was an Australian cricketer. He played sixteen first-class matches for New South Wales and South Australia between 1953/54 and 1958/59.

See also
 List of New South Wales representative cricketers

References

External links
 

1926 births
2010 deaths
Australian cricketers
New South Wales cricketers
South Australia cricketers
Cricketers from Newcastle, New South Wales